The Bolivian Football Federation (FBF) is the governing body of football in Bolivia. It was founded in 1925, making it the eighth oldest South American federation. It affiliated to CONMEBOL and FIFA in 1926 and is in charge of Bolivia national football team.

The FBF is the federation of two entities:
  Bolivian Primera División (Bolivian Professional Football League): comprises the 12 professional football teams in the first division.
  Asociación de Fútbol Nacional (ANF) (National Football Association): 9 departmental football associations, one from each of Bolivia’s nine departments.

César Salinas from 2018 until his death in 2020 was the president of the federation.

Association staff

References

External links 
 Bolivia at FIFA website
 Bolivian FA site

Bolivia
Football in Bolivia
Football
Sports organizations established in 1925